Sarawak Energy is the electric utility company of the Malaysian state of Sarawak. It is one of Malaysia's three electrical companies, the other two being Tenaga Nasional, supplying the Peninsular Malaysia, and Sabah Electricity, which serves the state of Sabah and Labuan.

History
In 1921, an Electrical Section within the Public Works Department was set up to look after the public electricity supply. In 1932, "Sarawak Electricity Supply Company" was formed by the Brooke Administration to operate public electricity supply within Sarawak.

The Sarawak Electricity Company was dissolved in 1962, under the Sarawak Electricity Supply Corporation Ordinance 1962, and later created into a Corporation, known as Sarawak Electricity Supply Corporation (SESCO) (Malay: Perbadanan Pembekalan Letrik Sarawak, and later Perbadanan Pembekalan Elektrik Sarawak or PPLS). In 1996, Sarawak Enterprise Corporation Berhad bought over 45% stake of the Corporation from the Sarawak Government.

In 2005, SESCO was privatised and known as Syarikat SESCO Berhad, and bought over by Sarawak Energy Berhad. 

Sarawak began to export electricity from Sarawak to West Kalimantan, Indonesia in January 2016 through a 275kV interconnection operated by Sarawak Energy. This project is the first successful power trading project for Malaysia.

Generation capacity
Sarawak Energy generates electricity mainly from two major types of plant; hydroelectric plants (HEP) and thermal plants. With a total installed capacity of 5,203 MW, the major towns in Sarawak are connected via a 275/132kV State Transmission Grid.

Hydroelectric power plants
 Bakun HEP - 2,400MW
 Batang Ai HEP - 108 MW
 Murum HEP - 944MW
Baleh HEP - 1,285MW  (Commissioning in 2026)

Thermal power plantsAmong the thermal plants in operation are: 
 Miri power station, Miri - 99 MW, Open Cycle Gas Turbine
 Bintulu power station, Bintulu - 330 MW, Combined Cycle Power Plant
 Tg Kidurong Power Station, Bintulu - 192 MW, Open Cycle Gas Turbine
 Sejingkat Power Station, Kuching - 210 MW, coal-fired power station (phase II)
 Mukah Power Station, Mukah - 2 x 135 MW, Coal-Fired Power Station
 Balingian Coal Fired Power Station, Balingian - 624 MW

Awards and nominations

See also
 National Grid, Malaysia
 Sabah Electricity
 Tenaga Nasional

References

External links
 Sarawak Energy
 Homepage of Bintulu Development Authority
 Chimneys of Malaysia
 Company Overview of Sarawak Energy Berhad, bloomberg.com
 Sarawak Energy Berhad (MYX: 2356), bursamalaysia.com

Electric power companies of Malaysia
Energy companies established in 1932
Non-renewable resource companies established in 1932
1932 establishments in Sarawak
Companies formerly listed on Bursa Malaysia
Privately held companies of Malaysia